Metztitlán (Otomi: Nziʼbatha) is a town and one of the 84 municipalities of Hidalgo, in central-eastern Mexico. The municipality covers an area of 814.7 km².

As of 2005, the municipality had a total population of 20,123.

History
Before the Spanish colonization of the region in 1519, Metztitlán was the site of a powerful, independent Otomi state, unconquered by the Aztec Empire. According to Professor Michael E. Smith, this small kingdom's independence was fortified and maintained as a result of the mountainous terrain in the valley surrounding it. Professor Smith wrote that the factors behind the state's enduring independence was due to the fact that "there were few resources of interest to the (Aztec) Empire in this area, and the final emperors may have decided that Metztitlán was not worth the effort."

In April and September of 1811, two indigenous revolts occurred in the city, ending in the deaths of 1225 people. The city was elevated to municipality status in 1869.

References

Municipalities of Hidalgo (state)
Populated places in Hidalgo (state)